Fort Payne City School District is a school district in DeKalb County, Alabama. The current superintendent is Brian Jett.

Notable alumni
 Sheila LaBarre
 Evan McPherson, professional football placekicker, Cincinnati Bengals

External links

References

School districts in Alabama